Nallapadu–Nandyal section connects  and  of Guntur district in the Indian state of Andhra Pradesh. Further, this section converges with Nallapadu–Pagidipalli section at Nallapadu. The branch line is an electrified single-track railway.

Jurisdiction 

References

Rail transport in Andhra Pradesh

5 ft 6 in gauge railways in India